CDRI could be:

 Central Drug Research Institute
 Chihuahuan Desert Research Institute
 Coalition for Disaster Resilient Infrastructure